Farm Frolics is a 1941 Warner Bros. Merrie Melodies cartoon supervised by Bob Clampett. The short was released on May 10, 1941.

Plot

The cartoon starts with the arm of an animator drawing a farm scene. The farm scene then colors itself, and the camera zooms in as a narrator begins:

A realistic-looking horse is seen and introduced as a prize-winning show animal; he whinnies (courtesy of Mel Blanc), and a comic triple plays out: The narrator asks the horse to do a trot, the horse obliges. The narrator asks for a gallop, the horse again obliges. The narrator asks the horse to do a "canter"; the horse immediately changes into more of a cartoon, sporting the bugged eyes, hair, and general mannerisms of the vaudeville star Eddie Cantor singing (vocally impersonated by Cliff Nazarro) "I'm Happy About the Whole Thing" (by Harry Warren and Johnny Mercer). The narrator admonishes the horse, who returns to his original realistic styling and grins sheepishly.
The "farmer's faithful old watchdog" is seen lazing on the porch; the narrator describes him as being "no longer very active" though "he still does a few little odd jobs around the house", one of these being fetching the newspaper.  A whistle signals the newspaper's arrival; the dog springs to alertness and makes a mad dash to the end of the driveway to retrieve it. After he brings it back to the porch, he spreads it out and begins reading the comics. He looks up at the audience and says, "I can hardly wait to see what happened to Dick Tracy!" (This gag would be used by Clampett again in The Great Piggy Bank Robbery.)
A proud mother hen lovingly covers her eggs and leaves them 'sleeping' in her nest; a mean-looking weasel stealthily creeps into the henhouse. The narrator frets but, just as the predator is about to grab the eggs, they all hatch at once. The chicks shout "BOO!" in unison. The frightened weasel evokes a Joe Penner catch-phrase, "Don't ever DOOO that!" and, turning green, gasps as his heart pounds.
An owl nestled in a tree is hooting dully until it suddenly breaks into smiles and says, "Who's Yehoodi?"
The narrator describes a pair of birds laboriously building their nest, "A little twig, a  bit of string, and a piece of straw", over and over until they actually create a house, which is approved by the Federal Housing Administration. The bird couple sing, "There's no place like home!"
The narrator asks a worried-looking field mouse with huge ears what is troubling him; the rodent claims, "I don't know, Doc. I...I just keep hearing things."
A grasshopper hops along a path, and chews a tobacco-like substance, and is about to spit it out into a spittoon-like plant, before he looks at the audience and says, "Sorry, folks! The Hays Office won't let me do it!" (This gag was removed from the Blue Ribbon re-release.)
Ants are seen coming, going, and communicating with each other around their anthill. The camera and mike zoom in to allow the viewer to understand the 'language' a female will use when she summons her young. We hear her shout, "Hen-REEEE!", to which her son replies, "Coming, Mother!" (the scene reminiscent of the catchphrase from the radio show, "The Aldrich Family").
A mouse and a cat are seen snuggled up together sleeping. The narrator remarks on this odd friendship. The mouse awakens and responds with nods to questions about the relationship. When asked by the narrator if he has anything he would like to say to his friends in the audience, the mouse nods again, then yells, "GET ME OUT OF HEEEEEEEEERE!!!!!!!!!", and escapes. A brief circle-around chase ends with the cat catching the mouse, then returning to the cozy snuggling. The mouse shrugs, apparently resigned to the situation. 
A recurring gag has seven piglets eagerly watching an alarm clock. When it finally hits 6:00 pm, one of them bellows, "Dinnertime!" They dash off to their mother, to the tune of the military bugle call "Mess Call". She braces for the onslaught as the sucklings (there now appears to be six of them) pile into her side. Zooming in on the mother pig's rather dejected face, she speaks to the audience in the manner of ZaSu Pitts: "Oh, dear... every day, it's the same thing!"

Notes
This is one of the cartoons that Warner would occasionally produce that featured none of its stable of characters, just a series of gags, usually based on outrageous stereotypes, plays on words, and topical references, as a narrator (Robert C. Bruce) describes the action. The dog was spotted in 1988's Who Framed Roger Rabbit toward the final scene.
The vocal group heard at the beginning is the Sportsmen Quartet, who often harmonized in Warner Bros. cartoons of the period, later becoming the resident singing group on Jack Benny's radio and TV shows. It is also on 50 Classic Cartoons Volume 3.
This cartoon was re-released issued into the Blue Ribbon Merrie Melodies program on November 15, 1949.
This cartoon fell into the public domain in 1970 in the United States when United Artists, the copyright owners to the Associated Artists Productions package, failed to renew the copyright in time. As such, unrestored copies can be seen on various public domain VHS and DVD sets. The public domain short was remastered on the Looney Tunes Golden Collection: Volume 5, Disc 3.
On October 3, 2022, a YouTube user named Jerico Dvorak uploaded the original titles and opening and closing bullet-style sequences, as well as the scene with the grasshopper excised from the Blue Ribbon re-release. The video was made private on YouTube a few hours later. It was reuploaded one day later with approval from the Library of Congress. This version uses the 35mm only for the missing sequences, but uses the Golden Collection print otherwise. A YouTube user named Clem uploaded the original nitrate print a few days later.
In the original opening sequence, a hand wipes away the title card before drawing the farm landscape. The opening song is also sung to completion where it was truncated for the Blue Ribbon re-release.
A sequence where a grasshopper chews a tobacco-like substance and leans back to spit, only for him to say that the Hay's Office won't allow him to do it, was cut for the Blue Ribbon re-release.
When the narrator is about to introduce the pigs for the first time, his quote "Here is a group of cute little piggies here in the mud" is abruptly cut at "mud". In addition, when the camera pan towards the pigs, the scene abruptly cuts as well. This persists in the Golden Collection print, and likely was an editing error when the cartoon was originally released, as the Library of Congress print with the original titles has this error as well.

Reception
The Film Daily called the short "good", saying, "There is no story to this Merrie Melodies but the comments of the animals as the audience is taken around the farm are highly amusing."

See also
 Looney Tunes and Merrie Melodies filmography (1940–1949)
 Looney Tunes Golden Collection

References

External links

1941 films
Merrie Melodies short films
Films directed by Bob Clampett
1940s American animated films
Films scored by Carl Stalling
1941 animated films
1940s English-language films